The Research Division of the Prime Minister's Department is an agency within the Malaysian Prime Minister's Department. According to a United States embassy cable dating back to 2006 that was leaked by WikiLeaks, the Research Division is actually the public name for the Malaysian External Intelligence Organisation (MEIO), the country's main foreign intelligence agency. 

A news report in May 2018 stated that the MEIO may be abolished under the new Mahathir government.

History

Origins and operations
The Research Division was established during the 1960s as part of Malaysia's national security covert intelligence agency. Muhammad Hatta, the Secretary of the Malaysian National Security Council, was known to have served as MEIO's Director General from 2002 to 2005. It was also known to have helped the Malaysian Special Branch in combating the Malayan Communist Party. According to WikiLeaks, the Malaysian External Intelligence Organisation also covertly supported the secessionist groups in Mindanao. 

In 2006, it also facilitated peace talks between the Philippines government and the Moro Islamic Liberation Front. More recently, MEIO reportedly helped to combat the Islamic State.

Post–2018 Malaysian general election
According to reports by several Malaysian news media including The Star, The Sun, and the news blog Malaysia Today in May 2018, the Malaysian External Intelligence Organisation had 300 personnel, operated as a spy agency, and reported directly to former Prime Minister Najib Tun Razak. The organization was allegedly used to monitor government critics at home and abroad. Following the 2018 Malaysian general election, members of the Royal Malaysia Police's Commercial Crime Division searched the home of a female individual, who was reported to be the head of the Malaysian External Intelligence Organisation, for documents that Najib had given her two days before the 2018 election. The Police also searched two buildings belonging to the agency.

In late July 2018, a letter from MEIO's Director-General Hasanah Abu Hamid dating back to 4 May 2018 was leaked to the media. The letter was reportedly addressed to Gina Haspel, the designated Director of the Central Intelligence Agency and appealed for the Trump Administration to support Najib's administration even in the event that Barisan Nasional won by a simple majority or just one seat. She also described the Pakatan Harapan leader Mahathir Mohamed as an anti-Semite. In response, the Finance Minister Lim Guan Eng called for an investigation into allegations that the Research Division had written to the CIA, describing the letter as an attempt to solicit foreign intervention.

Meanwhile, former Prime Minister Najib denied having any knowledge of the Research Division's letter, claiming that it was a government secret not meant for public eyes. During a press conference on 31 July, Hasanah's lawyer Datuk Shaharudin Ali confirmed that the letter was genuine and asserted that the letter between MEIO and the CIA was part of the work of intelligence gathering and national security. The former Director Hasanah lodged a police report on the grounds that the letter should not have been leaked for national security reasons. On 6 August 2018, Ab Jalil Backer, the leader of a group called Angkatan Karyawan Nasionalis, claimed that the CIA had leaked MEIO's letter and also alleged that the US spy agency had been colluding with Pakatan Harapan.

On 22 August 2018, the news website Malaysiakini reported that the Malaysian Government appointed Ahmad Shublee Othman as the next Director of MEIO.

In late August 2018, former MEIO director-general Hasanah was remanded in police custody over the alleged misappropriation of election funds during the 2018 general election. In mid April 2021, High Court Justice Datuk Ahmad Shahrir Mohd Salleh granted Hasanah a "discharge not amounting to an acquittal" (DNAA) in a trial involving the misuse of RM50.4 million (US$12.1 million) from the 1Malaysia Development Berhad sovereignty fund. 

In June 2022, Hasanah applied to have her DNAA converted to a full acquittal. On 10 August 2022, Judicial Commissioner Roz Mawar Rozain granted Hasanah a full acquittal.

Structure
The Research Division or Malaysian External Intelligence Organisation is part of Malaysia's national security covert intelligence agency. It is believed to have more than 1,000 agents, officers, and operatives around the world. MEIO works with several other Malaysian government departments and agencies including the Special Branch, military intelligence, and the National Security Council. MEIO has covert intelligence sources around the world and shares its information with the Prime Minister, the Malaysian Cabinet, Special Branch, and other agencies. 

The Division's Director-General was Datuk Hasanah Abdul Hamid until the 2018 Malaysian general election.

Further reading

Notes and references

Federal ministries, departments and agencies of Malaysia
Prime Minister's Department (Malaysia)
Malaysian intelligence agencies